Fossarus elegans is a species of sea snail, a marine gastropod mollusk in the family Planaxidae.

Distribution

Description 
The maximum recorded shell length is 5.3 mm.

Habitat 
Minimum recorded depth is 128 m. Maximum recorded depth is 260 m.

References

External links

Planaxidae
Gastropods described in 1882
Taxa named by Sidney Irving Smith